The Clown and the Kid is a 1961 American drama film directed by Edward L. Cahn and starring John Lupton, Michael McGreevey and Mary Webster.

Plot
When Moko the Clown dies, his orphaned son Shawn befriends a mysterious wanderer named Peter. The two become close friends and partners until a closely guarded secret tears them apart.

Cast
 John Lupton as Peter
 Michael McGreevey as Shawn
 Don Keefer as Moko
 Mary Webster as Robin
 Barry Kelley as Barker
 Edith Evanson as Mother Superior
 Ken Mayer as Trooper
 Peggy Stewart as Sister Grace
 James Parnell as Second Patrolman
 Charles G. Martin as Daly
 Mary Adams as Mother Superior (uncredited)
 Victor French as Patrolman #1 (uncredited)

References

External links

1961 films
1961 drama films
1960s English-language films
American black-and-white films
American drama films
Circus films
Films about clowns
Films directed by Edward L. Cahn
Films produced by Edward Small
Films scored by Richard LaSalle
United Artists films
1960s American films